The second season of Rookie Blue began airing on 23 June 2011 on both ABC and Global. The entire season one cast, led by Missy Peregrym, Ben Bass and Gregory Smith returned, whilst Melanie Nicholls-King continued to recur as Officer Noelle Williams.

Production 
The series was renewed for a second 13-episode season on 12 July 2010. Filming of the second season was scheduled to take place between 1 September 2010 and 24 January 2011. Camille Sullivan joined the cast as Detective Jo Rosati. Lauren Holly guest starred as Elaine Peck, a Superintendent in charge of Operations at the Metropolitan Police Service.

Cast

Main Cast 
 Missy Peregrym as Officer Andy McNally
 Gregory Smith as Officer Dov Epstein
 Eric Johnson as Detective Luke Callaghan
 Enuka Okuma as Officer Traci Nash
 Travis Milne as Officer Chris Diaz 
 Charlotte Sullivan as Officer Gail Peck
 Noam Jenkins as Detective Jerry Barber
 Matt Gordon as Officer Oliver Shaw
 Lyriq Bent as Sergeant Frank Best
 Ben Bass as Officer Sam Swarek

Recurring 
 Melanie Nicholls-King as Officer Noelle Williams

Episodes

U.S. Nielsen ratings
The following is a table for the United States ratings, based on average total estimated viewers per episode, of Rookie Blue on ABC.

References

External links
  for Global
  for ABC
 
 
 List of Rookie Blue episodes at The Futon Critic
 List of Rookie Blue episodes at MSN TV

2011 Canadian television seasons